Ashirbad (Farewell to Bride) is an album of situational songs (concept album) describing emotional expressions of a bride and her relatives during marriage ceremony in Nepalese villages. Ashirbad literally translates as blessing in the Nepali language. After the wedding, the bride moves into her husband’s family, usually far away from her family and friends. Since marriage is arranged by the elders of the family, the bride is surrounded by unfamiliar people, in new relationship, and with new duties. It is a sad moment for the bride and her family. The parents, relatives and friends of the bride pray that God will bless her with all the fortune and the happiness of the world in her new home.

The album was produced in 1970, at the eve of wedding of the crown prince Dipendra of Nepal. The lyrics were written by Laxman Lohani and the music was written by Shiva Shankar. The songs comprise contemporary modern styles blended with Nepalese folk tunes. The beautiful song 'Nausaya Khola' has an impression of Newari classic 'Malashri song' which is sung during the greatest festival "Dashain (Mohani)'.

Track listing

References

1970 compilation albums
Concept albums
Albums by Nepalese artists